Igor Schvede (born on 5 December 1970) is an Estonian Rear Admiral and the former Commander of the Estonian Navy from 2007 to 2012.

Biography
Schvede was born in 1970 in, his military career began at the Leningrad Nakhimov Naval School. He later joined the Soviet Navy, receiving education at the Frunze Naval Academy (now the St. Petersburg Naval Institute), where he graduated with a bachelors in Electromechanical Engineering. Schvede was commissioned in 1993 in the navy, the beginning of which he participated in the withdrawal of the Soviet Armed Forces from Estonia. He has commanded Estonian two patrol craft. In 2005, he was deployed to Afghanistan. In 2012, he graduated from US Naval Command College. From 2007 to 2012, he commanded Estonian Navy. From 2013 to 2016, Schvede was Chief of Staff at the Headquarters of the Estonian Defence Forces In August 2016, he was appointed as Estonia's representative to NATO and the European Union. Since 2021, he has been an advisor at the Ministry of Defence.

Schvede was given the rank of Rear Admiral in February 2020. He is a recipient of the Order of the Cross of the Eagle of the Defence League.

Personal life
He is fluent in Estonian, English and Russian.

References

Living people
1970 births
Estonian admirals
Estonian people of Russian descent